Manuel Stirling was a Uruguayan political figure of the 19th century.

Background

He was from Paysandú, in the north of Uruguay.

His family funeral monument, an imposing 80-ton structure, declared a national historic monument in 2004, was built in 1898. His grandson, Guillermo Stirling, served as interior minister in early 21st century, and was the Colorado Party (Uruguay)'s presidential candidate in 2004.

Political role

Stirling served as a deputy of the republic.

He also served as a senator of the republic.

References

 
 :es:Guillermo Stirling

See also

 List of political families#Uruguay
 Politics of Uruguay

Uruguayan people of Scottish descent
Members of the Senate of Uruguay
Members of the Chamber of Representatives of Uruguay
Year of death missing
Year of birth missing